Åsvær is a small group of islands lying on the Arctic Circle in the municipality of Dønna in Nordland county, Norway. The Åsvær Lighthouse was built here in 1876. The islands are noted for their herring fishery.

References

External links
Åsvær lighthouse 

Islands of Nordland
Dønna